Brewcaria brocchinioides is a species of plants in the genus Brewcaria. This species is endemic to Venezuela.

References

brocchinioides
Flora of Venezuela
Plants described in 1957